Target Kolkata is a 2013 Bengali film directed by Kartick Singh, produced by Shyamol Biswas and presented by SRB Films. The music of this film is composed by Nayan Bhattacharya and Dron Acharya. This was a surprise regional hit of 2013 and had an occupancy of around 55-60% for 2 weeks.

Plot

Cast 
 Rishi
 Bidita Bag
 Subrata Dutta
 Mia Maelzer
 Suparna Malakar
 Sreela Majumdar
 Suhasini Mulay
 Bodhisattwa Majumdar
 Prasun Gayen
 Jagannath Guha
 Arindam Sil

Songs

Reception 
Madhusree Ghosh of The Times of India opined that "Honestly, Target Kolkata had potential. The plot, which mixed Kolkata’s underworld with international terrorism, was different from regular commercial movies, the music directors took effort to make melodies worth remembering and especially the cinematography was exceptionally good as the cinematographers took great joy to show Kolkata in light and also in darkness".

See also 
 Life in Park Street, a 2012 Bengali-language films

References 

Bengali-language Indian films
2010s Bengali-language films
2013 films